Jack Weinstein (October 18, 1928 – April 20, 2006) was a U.S. Army veteran of the Korean War and a recipient of the Medal of Honor.

Biographical details
Born on October 18, 1928, in St. Francis, Kansas, Weinstein was drafted into the U.S. Army in 1950, serving a year and a half in Korea before settling in St. Francis. Weinstein and his wife had five children, ten grandchildren, and four great-grandchildren.

Weinstein died on April 20, 2006.

Medal of Honor
The bestowal of the Medal of Honor recognized Weinstein for his exceptionally valorous actions on October 19, 1951, near Kumsong, Korea, when his platoon came under enemy attack and Weinstein volunteered to stay and provide cover while his men withdrew. Weinstein killed six enemy combatants and, after running out of ammunition, used enemy grenades around him to keep the enemy forces back. Weinstein held his position until friendly forces moved back in and pushed the enemy back.

Weinstein was posthumously awarded the Medal of Honor by President Barack Obama in a March 18, 2014, White House ceremony.

The award came through the Defense Authorization Act which called for a review of Jewish American and Hispanic American veterans from World War II, the Korean War and the Vietnam War to ensure that no prejudice was shown to those deserving the Medal of Honor.

Medal of Honor citation

Awards, citations and decorations
In addition to the Medal of Honor, Weinstein received:
 Combat Infantryman Badge
 Purple Heart with one Bronze Oak Leaf Cluster
 Presidential Unit Citation
 National Defense Service Medal
 Korean Service Medal with two Bronze Service Stars
 United Nations Service Medal
 Republic of Korea-Korean War Service Medal

References

See also
 List of Korean War Medal of Honor recipients

1928 births
2006 deaths
United States Army soldiers
United States Army personnel of the Korean War
Korean War recipients of the Medal of Honor
United States Army Medal of Honor recipients
People from Lamar, Missouri
People from St. Francis, Kansas